Kireçburnu is a neighborhood of Sarıyer district in Istanbul Province, Turkey. It is located on the northern shore of Bosphorus at European side.

During the Byzantine Empire era Kireçburnu was a village named Kleidai tou Pontou. During the construction of Rumeli Castle by the Ottoman Sultan Mehmet II, the limekilns in the village were used as the construction material of the castle. Turkish for lime is kireç and for cape is burun; eventually the village was called Kireçburnu. As the urban fabric of İstanbul expanded Kireçburnu became a neighborhood of the city.

Kireçburnu is bordered by Tarabya in the south. The neighborhood is well known for its fish food restaurants.

Sports
The local sports club Kireçburnu Spor is active in football only. Its women's team was promoted from the Second League to the Turkish Women's First Football League for the 2015–16 season.

Transport
Kireçburnu is served by following city line buses:
 25A – Rumeli Kavağı – Hacıosman Metro
 25E – Sarıyer – Kabataş
 25Y – Hacıosman Metro -Sarıyer – Yunus Emre – Uyum Sitesi* 
 40 – Rumelifeneri – Garipçe – Taksim
 40B – Sarıyer – Beşiktaş
 42T – Bahçeköy – Taksim

References

External links
 

Sarıyer
Bosphorus
Quarters in Istanbul